Hapithus agitator is a species of cricket in the genus Hapithus ("flightless bush crickets"), in the subfamily Hapithinae ("bush crickets"). A common name for it is "restless bush cricket". It is found in North America.

Breeding
Males of this species make calls not to attract females, like other similar organisms do; they themselves choose with whom to mate thanks to chemical interactions which occur when both individuals connect their antennas together.

References

External links

 NCBI Taxonomy Browser, Hapithus agitator
 

Hapithinae
Insects described in 1864